Chinese South Korean or South Korean Chinese may refer to:
China–South Korea relations
South Korea–Taiwan relations
Ethnic Chinese in South Korea
South Koreans in China
South Koreans in the Republic of China
Multiracial people of Chinese and South Korean descent